Meclizine, sold under the brand name Bonine, among others, is an antihistamine used to treat motion sickness and dizziness (vertigo). It is taken by mouth. Effects generally begin in an hour and last for up to a day.

Common side effects include sleepiness and dry mouth. Serious side effects may include allergic reactions. Use in pregnancy appears safe, but has not been well studied while use in breastfeeding is of unclear safety. It is believed to work in part by anticholinergic and antihistamine mechanisms.

Meclizine was patented in 1951 and came into medical use in 1953. It is available as a generic medication and often over the counter. In 2020, it was the 142nd most commonly prescribed medication in the United States, with more than 4million prescriptions.

Medical uses
Meclizine is used to treat symptoms of motion sickness. Safety and efficacy in children younger than twelve years of age has not been established; therefore, use in this population is not recommended. Meclizine should be taken with caution in the elderly due to increased risk of confusion and amnesia.

Motion sickness
Meclizine is effective in inhibiting nausea, vomiting, and dizziness caused by motion sickness.

The drug is safe for treating nausea in pregnancy and is a first-line therapy for this use. Doxylamine is similarly safe. Meclizine may not be strong enough for especially sickening motion stimuli and second-line defenses should be tried in those cases.

Vertigo
Meclizine may be used to treat motion sickness or vertigo such as in those with Ménière's disease.

Side effects
Some common side effects such as drowsiness, dry mouth, and tiredness may occur. Meclizine has been shown to have fewer dry mouth side effects than the traditional treatment for motion sickness, transdermal scopolamine. A very serious allergic reaction to this drug is unlikely, but immediate medical attention should be sought if it occurs. Symptoms of a serious allergic reaction may include rash, itching, swelling, severe dizziness, and trouble breathing.

Drowsiness
Drowsiness may result as a side effect of taking meclizine. Users are advised not to operate heavy machinery while under the influence. The consumption of alcohol while under the influence of meclizine may result in additional drowsiness.

Elderly
As with any anticholinergic agent, meclizine may cause confusion or aggravate symptoms in those with dementia in the geriatric population (older than 65 years). Therefore, caution should be used when administering meclizine to the elderly.

Mechanism of action
Meclizine is an antagonist at H1 receptors. It possesses anticholinergic, central nervous system depressant, and local anesthetic effects. Its antiemetic and antivertigo effects are not fully understood, but its central anticholinergic properties are partially responsible. The drug depresses labyrinth excitability and vestibular stimulation, and it may affect the medullary chemoreceptor trigger zone. It has however been suggested that meclizine only has an inhibitory effect under normal viewing-circumstances, as the drug has been shown to enhance an isolated vestibular response. Much like motion-sickness arises from a discrepancy between multiple senses, Meclizine most likely affects a wide array of sensory mechanisms related to self-motion.
Meclizine also is a dopamine antagonist at D1-like and D2-like receptors but does not cause catalepsy in mice, perhaps because of its anticholinergic activity.

Chemistry
Meclizine is a first-generation antihistamine (nonselective H1 antagonist) of the piperazine class. It is structurally and pharmacologically similar to buclizine, cyclizine, and hydroxyzine, but has a shorter half-life of six hours compared to cyclizine and hydroxyzine with about 20 hours (though half-life should not be confused with duration). It is used as an antivertigo/antiemetic agent, specifically in the prevention and treatment of nausea, vomiting, and dizziness associated with motion sickness. Meclizine is sometimes combined with opioids, especially ones of the open-chain class like methadone, dextropropoxyphene, and dipipanone. Similarly, Diconal is a combination drug containing dipipanone and cyclizine.

Synthesis
(4-Chlorphenyl)-phenylmethanol is halogenated with thionyl chloride before adding acetylpiperazine. The acetyl group is cleaved with diluted sulfuric acid. An N-alkylation of the piperazine ring with 3-methylbenzylchloride completes the synthesis.

Alternatively, the last step can be replaced by a reductive N-alkylation with 3-methylbenzaldehyde. The reductive agent is hydrogen, and Raney nickel is used as a catalyst.

Meclizine is obtained and used as a racemate, a 1:1 mixture of the two stereoisomers. Drug forms contain the racemic dihydrochloride.

Names
Meclizine is an international nonproprietary name.

It is sold under the brand names Bonine, Bonamine, Antivert, Postafen, Sea Legs, and Dramamine II (Less Drowsy Formulation). Emesafene is a combination of meclizine (1/3) and pyridoxine (2/3). In Canada, Antivert Tab (which is no longer available) was a combination of meclizine and nicotinic acid.

Notes

References

External links 
 
 

Antiemetics
Chlorcyclizines
Motion sickness
Pregnane X receptor agonists
Wikipedia medicine articles ready to translate
3-Tolyl compounds